Berberis aggregata, the clustered barberry, is a shrub native to western China (Gansu, Hubei, Qinghai, Shanxi, Sichuan). It grows at elevations of 1000–3500 m.

Berberis aggregata is a shrub up to 3 m tall with spines along the younger branches. Leaves are ovate, up to 25 mm long, dark green on the upper surface, much lighter underneath. Flowers are borne tightly clustered in a panicle of as many as 25 flowers. Berries are red, spherical, about 7 mm in diameter.

References

aggregata
Endemic flora of China
Flora of Gansu
Flora of Hubei
Flora of Qinghai
Flora of Shanxi
Flora of Sichuan
Plants described in 1908